The 2023 LET Access Series is a series of professional women's golf tournaments held from March through October 2023 across Europe. The LET Access Series is the second-tier women's professional golf tour in Europe and is the official developmental tour of the Ladies European Tour.

Tournament results
The table below shows the 2023 schedule. The numbers in brackets after the winners' names show the number of career wins they had on the LET Access Series up to and including that event.

Order of Merit rankings
The top 6 players on the LETAS Order of Merit earn membership of the Ladies European Tour for the 2024 season. Players finishing in positions 7–21 get to skip the first stage of the qualifying event and automatically progress to the final stage of the Lalla Aicha Tour School.

See also
2023 Ladies European Tour

References

External links

LET Access Series seasons
LET Access Series
LET Access Series